Joo Jong-hyuk may refer to:

 Joo Jong-hyuk (actor, born 1983), South Korean singer and actor
 Joo Jong-hyuk (actor, born 1991), South Korean actor

See also
Ju (Korean name), a Korean surname, also spelled Joo or Chu
Jong-hyuk, a Korean masculine given name